Foxup is a hamlet in the Yorkshire Dales in the Craven district of North Yorkshire, England. Foxup is in the civil parish of Halton Gill.

The source of the River Skirfare starts here at the confluence of Foxup Beck and Cosh Beck. The bridge over Foxup Beck in the hamlet is 17th century and was listed Grade II in 1958.

The village marks the end of the main road through Littondale. There are a number of Public Footpaths and Bridleways in and around the village. The area is a mixture of sheep and beef farming. Dairy farming is harder than in comparison to other locations further down the valley because of the limitations on grass types and transportation of dairy produce out of the area.

The name Foxup is of Old English origin, meaning "fox valley", from fox and hop "small enclosed valley",  apparently in contrast to the adjacent valley of Cosh Beck, known as Harrop, meaning "hare valley".

Images

References

External links

Foxup and Cosh on Littondale website

Villages in North Yorkshire